Steve Covino (born May 17, 1989, in Bristol, Connecticut) is a former American soccer player who last played for Connecticut FC Azul in the USL Premier Development League.  He is currently coaching within Atlanta United's Youth Academy with their U17's.
thumb

Career

College and amateur
Covino attended Bristol Central High School where he was voted the #1 player in CCC South Conference his senior year. He secured All-Conference honors in his sophomore and junior seasons, earned the team's Playmaker Award and MVP at the conclusion of his junior season, and as a senior he earned Team MVP honors, All-State recognition and All-New England.

He went on to play four years of college soccer at Siena College, where he was an All-MAAC Second Team selection as a sophomore in 2008 and also as a senior in 2010.  During his senior campaign at Siena, Covino scored 8 goals in 18 games and also added 4 assists for 20 points.  in 2010, he was also voted to the NSCAA/Performance Subaru All-North Atlantic Region Third Team.  He finished his college career with 10 goals and 10 assists in 71 games.

During his college years Covino also played with the Western Mass Pioneers in the USL Premier Development League.

Professional
Covino signed his first professional contract in 2011 when he was signed by F.C. New York of the USL Professional Division on February 1, 2011. He made his professional debut on April 9, 2011, in New York's first-ever game, a 3–0 loss to Orlando City. He then signed for Connecticut FC Azul on March 27, 2012.

Personal life
He is married to Lara Silva an actress who plays as “Eden” in The Chosen (TV series).

References

External links
 Siena profile

1989 births
Living people
American soccer players
Western Mass Pioneers players
F.C. New York players
AC Connecticut players
USL League Two players
Atlanta United FC non-playing staff
Association football midfielders
USL Championship players